Dale Johnston may refer to:

 Dale Johnston (curler)
 Dale Johnston, Canadian politician
 Dale Johnston, wrongfully convicted of murder

See also 

 Dale Johnson, American football executive